The 1996 Internazionali di Carisbo was a men's tennis tournament played on outdoor clay courts at the Cierrebi Club in Bologna in Italy and was part of the World Series of the 1996 ATP Tour. It was the twelfth edition of the tournament and was held from 17 June through 23 June 1996. Fifth-seeded Alberto Berasategui won the singles title.

Finals

Singles

 Alberto Berasategui defeated  Carlos Costa 6–3, 6–4
 It was Berasategui's 1st singles title of the year and the 10th of his career.

Doubles

 Brent Haygarth /  Christo van Rensburg defeated  Karim Alami /  Gábor Köves 6–1, 6–4
 It was Haygarth's 2nd title of the year and the 4th of his career. It was van Rensburg's 2nd title of the year and the 22nd of his career.

References

External links
 ITF tournament edition details

Internazionali di Carisbo
Bologna Outdoor
1995 in Italian tennis